Mostafa Kamel Taha Yossef El-Gamal (23 March 1910 – November 1969) was an Egyptian football forward who played for Egypt in the 1934 FIFA World Cup. He also played for Al-Mokhtalat SC (Zamalek SC now), and represented Egypt at the 1936 Summer Olympics.

Honours and achievements

Club
Zamalek
Cairo League:(6) 
Egypt Cup: (5)
Al Ahly
Egypt Cup: 1930–31
Cairo League: 1930–31
Sultan Hussein Cup: 1930–31

References

1910 births
1969 deaths
Egyptian footballers
Egypt international footballers
Association football forwards
Zamalek SC players
1934 FIFA World Cup players
Footballers at the 1936 Summer Olympics
Olympic footballers of Egypt